James McGarel-Hogg may refer to:

 James McGarel-Hogg, 1st Baron Magheramorne (1823–1890), British politician, Member of Parliament, and local government leader
 James McGarel-Hogg, 2nd Baron Magheramorne (1861–1903), Anglo-Irish peer